Beatrice Frederika Wright, Lady Wright, MBE, formerly Rathbone, née Clough, (17 June 1910 – 17 March 2003), was an American-born British politician.

Early life 
Wright was born in New Haven, Connecticut, in the United States on 17 June 1910; her father was an international banker. She came to England as an exchange student at Christ Church, Oxford, where she met, and in 1932 married, John Rathbone, with whom she had two children, including Tim, later MP for Lewes.  Her husband was elected in 1935 as Conservative Member of Parliament (MP) for Bodmin, but was killed in December 1940 in the Battle of Britain, aged 30.  In March 1941 she was elected unopposed as his successor and sat in the House of Commons for the rest of the Second World War. She stepped down at the 1945 general election, after becoming the first sitting MP to give birth to a child.

Later life 
In 1942, she married Paul Wright, who had a distinguished career as a diplomat and was knighted in 1975. They both converted to the Roman Catholic Church. They had one child, Faith Beatrice Wright, who married firstly Julian Shuckburgh (son of Evelyn Shuckburgh), and secondly Colin Clark, younger brother of the politician and diarist Alan Clark.

She served as Vice President of the Royal National Institute for the Deaf from 1978 to 2003. In 1996, she was appointed an MBE.

In 1982, she co-founded the charity Hearing Dogs for Deaf People, along with vet Dr. Bruce Fogle (father of Ben Fogle), serving as the charity's president until 1988. The charity's northern training centre, in Bielby, East Riding of Yorkshire, is named the Beatrice Wright Training Centre after her, and her daughter Faith Clark served as trustee and chairman of the charity between 2002 and 2022.

An American-born woman would not be elected to Parliament again until 2019, when another Conservative, Joy Morrissey, was elected in that year's general election for Beaconsfield.

References

External links
Beatrice Wright (Beatrice Rathbone)  at the Centre for Advancement of Women in Politics
Obituary, Sir Paul Wright, Daily Telegraph, 13 June 2005
Obituary, Sir Paul Wright, The Times, 30 June 2005
Hearing Dogs for Deaf People

1910 births
2003 deaths
Conservative Party (UK) MPs for English constituencies
Members of the Parliament of the United Kingdom for Bodmin
Members of the Order of the British Empire
Converts to Roman Catholicism
English Roman Catholics
UK MPs 1935–1945
Rathbone family
Female members of the Parliament of the United Kingdom for English constituencies
20th-century British women politicians
Alumni of Christ Church, Oxford
American emigrants to the United Kingdom
American women philanthropists
Catholics from Connecticut
English women philanthropists
Founders of charities
Philanthropists from Connecticut
Politicians from New Haven, Connecticut
20th-century American philanthropists
20th-century women philanthropists